The 2013–14 Liga III season is the 58th season of the Liga III, the third tier of the Romanian football league system. The season began on 30 August.

There is a new system, with six series of 12 teams that will play a regular season, followed by a play-off and play-out for each series. The regular season is a round-robin tournament. At the end of the regular season, the first six teams from each series will play a Promotion play-off and the winners will qualify to Liga II. The last six teams from each series will play a Relegation play-out. The last three teams from each series, at the end of play-out, will relegate to Liga IV.

Teams

The following five teams were relegated from Liga II: Chindia Târgoviște, FC Dinamo II București, FCM Bacău, Callatis Mangalia, FC Maramureș Universitar Baia Mare. Another six teams from Liga II were dissolved or chose to play in lower leagues: Astra II, Unirea Alba Iulia, Voința Sibiu, Politehnica Timișoara, Olt Slatina (2009).

Some of the teams promoted from 2012 to 2013 Liga IV were not capable to support a higher league presence. Here are the promoted teams that will play in the new season: FC Pojorâta, FCM Baia Mare, Unirea Jucu, CS Ineu, CSO Cugir, Nuova Mama Mia Becicherecu Mic, FC Avrig, Știința Turceni, FC Păpăuți, CSM Câmpina, Cetatea Târgu Neamț, Sporting Liești, Conpet Cireșu, Callatis 2012 Mangalia, Atletic Bradu, FC Balș, Gloria Cornești, AS Podari.

The following teams changed their names and/or location: Gloria Cornești became Gloria Popești-Leordeni, Seso Câmpia Turzii became Arieșul Turda, Fortuna Brazi became Fortuna Poiana Câmpina.

FCM Bacău and Minerul Mătăsari retired before the start of the competition. FC Maramureș didn't attend their first two games and will be excluded.

League tables

Seria I

Seria II

Seria III

Seria IV

Seria V

Seria VI

Promotion play-offs

At the end of the regular season, the first six teams from each series played a Promotion play-off and the winners will be promoted to the Liga II.

Seria I

Seria II

Seria III

Seria IV

Seria V

Seria VI

Relegation play-outs

At the end of the regular season, the teams placed below 7th place in all series will play a Relegation play-out and the last three teams will be relegated to the Liga IV.

Seria I

Seria II

Seria III

Seria IV

Seria V

Seria VI

See also

 2013–14 Liga I
 2013–14 Liga II

References

2013
3
Rom